Peristernia iniuensis is a species of sea snail, a marine gastropod mollusk in the family Fasciolariidae, the spindle snails, the tulip snails and their allies.

Description

Distribution
P. iniuensis has been found in the Cook Islands and in Polynesia.

References

Fasciolariidae
Gastropods described in 1891